Escuela de Fútbol Beca Ramos known as EFBR and also called Gladiadores is a Puerto Rican soccer team that plays in Caguas.  They play in the Liga Nacional.

Liga Nacional
Lost their first game 6-1 to Criollos de Caguas FC.

Current squad

References

Puerto Rico Soccer League 2nd Division
Football clubs in Puerto Rico
2009 establishments in Puerto Rico
Liga Nacional de Fútbol de Puerto Rico teams